Obed Hall (December 23, 1757 – April 1, 1828) was an American politician and a United States representative from New Hampshire.

Early life
Born in Raynham in the Province of Massachusetts Bay, Hall later moved to Madbury and then to Bartlett, Carroll County, New Hampshire and engaged in agricultural pursuits.

Career
Since travel at that time was hazardous, Hall became an innkeeper at his farm, which was considered benefactor to the traveling public rather than businessman.  Mr Hall was one of two appointed as Surveyor of Highways petitioned  the General Court in 1793 for a tax of one penney per acre to be used for the improvement of roads within the town.

A member of the board of selectmen, Hall served as a member of the New Hampshire House of Representatives. He was appointed judge of the court of common pleas by Governor John Taylor Gilman in 1805, solicitor and Sheriff in 1812.

Elected as a Democratic-Republican to the Twelfth Congress, Hall served as United States Representative for the state of New Hampshire from (March 4, 1811 – March 3, 1813). He was a member of the New Hampshire Senate in 1819.

Death
Hall died in Bartlett, Carroll County, New Hampshire, on April 1, 1828 (age 70 years, 100 days). Originally, he was interred at Garland Ridge Cemetery, Near Bartlett, Carroll County, New Hampshire. He was reinterred at Evergreen Cemetery, Portland, Maine.

Family life
Son of Jonathan and Lydia Leonard Hall, he married Abigail Dean on May 6, 1784. After her death on November 10, 1804, he married Eliza Fox on June 11, 1805. After Hall's death, Eliza married Richard Odell in November 1832 and moved to Portland, Maine.

References

External links

1757 births
1828 deaths
People from Raynham, Massachusetts
Democratic-Republican Party members of the United States House of Representatives from New Hampshire